Nicholas "Nick" Delpopolo (born February 8, 1989) is an American judoka. He competed in the men's 73 kg event at the 2012 Summer Olympics; after defeating Cheung Chi Yip in the second round and Dirk Van Tichelt in the third, he lost to Wang Ki-Chun in the fourth round and was eliminated by Nyam-Ochir Sainjargal in the repechages.

On August 6, 2012, Delpopolo was expelled from the Olympics by the IOC after he tested positive for cannabis. Upon exiting the games, Delpopolo stated the positive test result was caused by "inadvertent consumption of food that I did not realize had been baked with marijuana, before I left for the Olympic Games."

On August 9, 2016, Delpopolo competed again at the 2016 Summer Olympics in the men's 73 kg event, defeating Ahmed Goumar (Niger) in the first round, Odbayar Ganbaatar (Mongolia) in the second round, and ultimately losing to Miklós Ungvári (Hungary) in the Quarter-finals by penalty points. Delpopolo ultimately finished 7th in his division.

Personal life

Delpopolo was born as Petar Perović (Montenegrin/Serbian Cyrillic: Петар Перовић) in Nikšić, SR Montenegro, SFR Yugoslavia. Of Montenegrin heritage, his biological parents left him as a toddler. After being orphaned for 21 months he was adopted as a 2-year-old by a New Jersey family. As his adoptive father Dominic's family was from Serbia, they started adoption process there until eventually they were taken to an orphanage near Nikšić, Montenegro. Several years later they adopted another child there, a daughter named Helen.

Nick was raised by his adoptive parents in Westfield, New Jersey and attended Bergen Catholic High School.

In 2009, he went to Montenegro to see his biological father, but chose not to reveal himself because the man looked hostile. Nick also plans to find his biological mother who is in Serbia.

References

External links
 
 
 Nick Delpopolo at TeamUSA.org

1989 births
Living people
American male judoka
Bergen Catholic High School alumni
Doping cases in judo
Olympic judoka of the United States
Judoka at the 2012 Summer Olympics
Judoka at the 2016 Summer Olympics
American people of Montenegrin descent
American people of Serbian descent
People from Westfield, New Jersey
Judoka at the 2019 Pan American Games
Pan American Games medalists in judo
Pan American Games bronze medalists for the United States
Medalists at the 2019 Pan American Games